Little velvetfishes or simply velvetfishes are a family, the Aploactinidae, of marine ray-finned fishes classified within the order Scorpaeniformes. They are small fish that have skin with a velvet texture. They are found in the Indo-Pacific region.

Taxonomy
Aploactinidae was first formally recognised as a family by the American ichthyologists David Starr Jordan and Edwin Chapin Starks in 1904.The 5th edition of Fishes of the World classifies the family within the suborder Scorpaenoidei which in turn is classified within the order Scorpaeniformes. Other authorities place the Scorpaenoidei within the Perciformes. The results of some studies suggest that the velvetfishes into an expanded stonefish clade, the family Synanceiidae because all of these fish have a curved sabre-like lacrimal spine that can project, using a switch-blade-like mechanism, out from underneath their eye. The name of the family is taken from that of the type genus, Aploactis. which is a compound of  "haplo" meaning "single" or "simple", and actis, meaning "ray", presumed to refer to the simple, unbranched soft rays of the fins.

Genera
The following genera are classified within the family Aploactinidae:
 Acanthosphex Fowler, 1938
 Adventor Whitley, 1952
 Aploactis Temminck & Schlegel, 1843
 Aploactisoma Castelnau, 1872
 Bathyaploactis Whitley, 1933
 Cocotropus Kaup, 1858
 Erisphex Jordan & Starks 1904
 Kanekonia Tanaka, 1915
 Matsubarichthys Poss & Johnson, 1991
 Neoaploactis Eschmeyer & Allen, 1978
 Paraploactis Bleeker, 1864
 Peristrominous Whitley, 1952
 Prosoproctus Poss & Eschmeyer, 1979
 Pseudopataecus Johnson, 2004
 Ptarmus J. L. B. Smith, 1947
 Sthenopus Richardson, 1848
 Xenaploactis Poss & Eschmeyer, 1980

Characteristics
Velvetfishes get their name from the modified, prickly scales which cover the body and give the fish a velvety appearance, although there are some species which do not have these modified scales and have smooth skin, They typically have knobby lumps on the head, although sometimes there may be sharp spines. All of the fin rays are unbranched and the spines in the anal fin are normally weakly developed and blunt. The dorsal fin has its origin over or nearly above the eye. The first 3 to 5 dorsal fin spines may be separate, from the rest of the dorsal fin and can be raised or have almost no membrane between them. These separate spines form a separate fin in 4 species. The pelvic fin has a single spine and 2 or 3 soft rays, the pectoral fins are very large. In most species there is a fleshy extension on the anterior isthmus. There are no teeth on the palatines and no gill slit to the rear of last gill arch. One species, Prosoproctus pataecus, from the South China Sea, uniquely among scorpaenoids has its anus very far forward, just to the rear of the base of the pelvic fins.

Distribution and habitat
Velvetfishes are found mainly in the eastern Indian and western Pacific Oceans, but some species are found in the eastern Indian Ocean. The adults are found among vegetation or over rocky, shelly, coral rubble or coralline algae substrates.

Biology
Velvetfishes are uncommon and little-known. These fishes are very well camouflaged ambush predators hiding amongst algae or rubble on or in the vicinity of rocky and coral reefs. The spines in the fin are venom bearing. Little is known about their spawning behaviour but they do have pelagic larvae, the large pectoral fins develop early as an adaptation to their pelagic mode of life.

References

Aploactinidae
Scorpaeniformes
Taxa named by David Starr Jordan
Taxa named by Edwin Chapin Starks
Fish families